Raazi is a 2018 Indian Hindi-language spy action thriller film directed by Meghna Gulzar and produced by Vineet Jain, Karan Johar, Hiroo Yash Johar and Apoorva Mehta under the banners of Junglee Pictures and Dharma Productions. It stars Alia Bhatt in the lead role and features Vicky Kaushal, Rajit Kapur, Shishir Sharma, and Jaideep Ahlawat in supporting roles. The film is an adaptation of Harinder Sikka's 2008 novel Calling Sehmat, a true account of an Indian Research and Analysis Wing (RAW) agent who, upon her father's request, is married into a family of military officers in Pakistan to relay information to India, prior to the Indo-Pakistani War of 1971. Principal photography of Raazi began in July 2017 in Mumbai and was completed on 27 October 2017. It was shot across several locations including Patiala, Nabha, Malerkotla and Doodhpathri.

Raazi was released on 11 May 2018. It was also a critical success, with Meghna's direction and Bhatt's performance receiving praise. 

At the 64th Filmfare Awards, Raazi received 15 nominations and won a leading 5 awards (tying with Andhadhun), including Best Film, Best Director (Gulzar) and Best Actress (Bhatt).

Plot

The story flashes back to events preceding the Indo-Pakistani War of 1971. Hidayat Khan is an Indian freedom fighter posing as an informant for the Indian government. He wishes to make his 20-year-old daughter Sehmat an agent and continue the family tradition of being in service to the country before his impending death from lung cancer. Sehmat agrees and is trained by senior R&AW officer Mir and his assistant, a young Bakshi. Khan uses his friendship with Brigadier Parvez Syed of the Pakistan Army to get Sehmat married to his younger son, Iqbal Syed, another military officer. In Pakistan Sehmat wins the trust of the entire family except Abdul, Syed's trusted servant. Brigadier Syed is promoted to Major General, which results in crucial documents and members of the country's defense forces passing through his house. Sehmat establishes communication channels with her handlers back in India and starts relaying information.

Sehmat relays information on planning of an offensive against India. The information points to the planned attack on the Indian aircraft carrier , then deployed in the Bay of Bengal. Abdul discovers her identity and she runs him down with a car. This takes a heavy emotional toll on her. Sehmat reluctantly kills Mehboob Syed, Iqbal's elder army officer brother after he suspects her. She is distraught at having widowed Munira, Mehboob's wife, and saves her from police interrogation.  Mir visits Sehmat and Iqbal disguised and conveys to her an escape plan from Pakistan. She is eventually discovered by Iqbal, who is heartbroken. He confronts her but Sehmat makes away with a child at gunpoint. Sehmat arrives in Burkha at the agreed Rendezvous point with Mir and his undercover RAW team but is cornered by ISI agents and Iqbal, and seeing no way out the RAW team throws a grenade and make away, in which Iqbal and Sehmat are killed. It is then revealed that Sehmat is still alive; the woman Iqbal confronted was actually another burqa-clad agent who switched places with Sehmat and died in the blast along with Iqbal. Shocked by her husband's death and the fact that Mir was even ready to kill her, Sehmat realizes the insignificance of relationships and humanity in this line of work. Broken by the destruction of a family, she returns with the RAW team to India and discovers that she is pregnant with Iqbal's child, which she decides to raise.

Nikhil Bakshi concludes his speech, with Samar Khan, Sehmat's son, present among the officers.  The film ends with aged Sehmat staring out of the window in the middle of nowhere.

Cast

 Alia Bhatt as Sehmat Khan Syed
 Vicky Kaushal as Syed Iqbal
 Jaideep Ahlawat as RAW Agent Manav Chaudhary (codenamed Mir) 
 Rajit Kapur as Hidayat Khan
 Shishir Sharma as Brigadier (later, Major-General) Syed Parvez
 Soni Razdan as Tej Khan
 Amruta Khanvilkar as Munira 
 Arif Zakaria as Abdul
 Ashwath Bhatt as Syed Mehboob 
 Aman Vasishth as Nikhil Bakshi
 Rajvir Chauhan as ISI Officer
 Jitender Hooda as RAW Agent
 Rajesh Jais as Sarwar
 Kanwaljit Singh as Army Chief (cameo appearance)
 Sanjay Suri as Samar Khan (cameo appearance)

Production

Development
Since 2014, Priti Sahani, president of Junglee Pictures, was trying to acquire the film rights to Harinder S. Sikka's 2008 novel Calling Sehmat, which details the true story of an Indian woman secret agent married to a Pakistani army officer to provide the Research and Analysis Wing (RAW) with confidential information prior to the Indo-Pakistani War of 1971. During the production of Talvar (2015), she got in touch with Meghna Gulzar and enquired if she was interested in directing a film adaptation of the novel. Meghna agreed but was informed a few months later that the film didn't materialize. In February 2016, she was approached by another producer to adapt the same novel, and she agreed again, thinking it was "a tad serendipitous" to be offered the same project twice.

When talks on that proposal also fell through, Meghna decided she had "a karmic connection" with Calling Sehmat given that Sikka had approached her father Gulzar to direct the film adaptation when the novel was released; she had developed a rapport with Sikka during previous meetings while discussing the production and told the author that they approach Sahani again for the film adaptation. The talks were successful, and in December 2016, Meghna announced the project as her next film. Meghna was drawn to the story as it was "an ordinary girl's extraordinary feat" and was "not chest-thumpingly anti-Pak, pro-India, pro-war sloganeering", and it being a true account "makes [the film] that much more powerful". She tried to remain as true to the story as possible during production.

Even though the film was set in the backdrop of the Indo-Pakistani War of 1971, it didn't feature action scenes unlike other films under the same backdrop since the story leads to the beginning of the war and not the actual conflict. Meghna had heard stories of the war from her family members, having been born after the war was over. She felt it was "an important milestone in [Indian] history" and was motivated to make the film as the story is important in present times when neighboring countries have non-cordial relationships. Meghna said: "The human element makes it timeless. From my father’s friends in Pakistan, I understand that the lines are on paper and brought up politically but at the end of the day, we’re similar in our clothes, cuisine, and culture."

In December 2016, it was being speculated that Alia Bhatt had been offered the lead role in the film, a news which was confirmed to be true in April 2017. Karan Johar's production house Dharma Productions came on board to co-produce the film along with Junglee Pictures in April 2017. The casting of Vicky Kaushal was officially announced in June 2017.

Filming

The filming process of Raazi began in July 2017 and the first schedule which took place in Mumbai was wrapped up by mid-August 2017. Originally, the first schedule of Raazi was supposed to be held in Kashmir but due to the state of unrest in the valley, the makers decided to shift the shooting location to Mumbai where all the indoor scenes were filmed at a set created inside Film City. The second schedule of the film took place in Punjab, where filming was done in Patiala and Malerkotla during August and September 2017. The shooting in Patiala was stalled for a few days due to the violence that erupted after the conviction of Dera Sacha Sauda chief Gurmeet Ram Rahim Singh on 25 August 2017 and the curfew that was imposed as a consequence of which. After completing the Punjab schedule, the production team of Raazi arrived in Kashmir on 17 September 2017 for a ten-day schedule where filming was done at Pahalgam, Shiv Pora in Srinagar and Doodhpathri in Budgam district. The final schedule of shooting was supposed to take place in Punjab, but was completed in Delhi instead due to the unrest caused by Gurmeet Ram Rahim Singh's arrest. Filming came to an end on 27 October 2017.

Costumes for the film were designed by Maxima Basu.

Controversy 

Amidst a heated atmosphere of public anger and discussion during July 2020, Sikka alleged that Meghna changed the title of the film without his permission and he was not shown the director's cut of the film which was part of the contract. He also alleged that Gulzar and her father took a pro-Pakistani stand in the film, and that producers Jain and Johar attempted to discredit him.

The author also claimed that Meghna Gulzar "tweaked" the story to demean RAW and praised the Pakistan Army.

Soundtrack 

The music and background score of the film is composed by Shankar–Ehsaan–Loy while the lyrics are penned by Gulzar. The songs featured in the film are sung by Arijit Singh, Harshdeep Kaur, Vibha Saraf, Shankar Mahadevan and Sunidhi Chauhan. The song "Ae Watan (Female)" also contains the lyrics of Allama Iqbal's nazm "Lab Pe Aati Hai Dua", that is the national prayer of Pakistan being offered during school assemblies. The soundtrack was officially released on 18 April 2018 by Zee Music Company.

Vipin Nair of The Hindu gave the soundtrack 4/5 stating that it's "a gem of a soundtrack" and "wish the soundtrack were longer". The Times of Indias Debarati Sen, in her review, said the album is "definitely one to be heard on the loop". She further added that it is a "must for music lovers and Gulzar fans".

Release and reception 
The first poster of Raazi was released on 9 April 2018 through the official Twitter handle of the film, while the trailer of the film was launched on 10 April 2018. The film was released on 11 May 2018.

Raazi received universal critical acclaim.

Anna M. M. Vetticad of Firstpost termed the film as a heart-stopping, heartbreaking espionage drama and gave it 4.5 stars out of 5. The Times of India rated the film 4 out of 5 stars, stating that "Raazi rewrites the spy-thriller genre with emotions, instead of explosions." Rohit Vats of Hindustan Times praised Alia Bhatt's performance and gave the film a rating of 4 out of 5 saying that, "Raazi is a sensibly written and finely performed film that takes a close look at the ordinary lives of extraordinary people. Not to miss." Shalini Langer of The Indian Express praised director Meghna Gulzar for not allowing Raazi to become a "chest-thumping spectacle of jingoism" and gave the film a rating of 3.5 out of 5 saying that, "at a time when hate and anger are the currency of the subcontinent, a film like Raazi needs to be made." Meena Iyer of Daily News and Analysis gave the film a rating of 4 out of 5, saying that, "Alia Bhatt-Vicky Kaushal starrer will blow your mind!" Sukanya Verma of Rediff.com appreciated the acting performances of the film, its music composed by Shankar–Ehsaan–Loy, cinematography as well as editing, and gave the film a rating of 4 out of 5 saying that, "Raazi is a rarity. It is intense, riveting, clever, dark, sad, lyrical, heartfelt, relevant and understated." Rajeev Masand of News18 gave the film a rating of 3.5, calling Bhatt the "beating heart of Raazi", and stated, "The film is admirable also because it's a measured, mostly intelligent thriller that asks us to consider concepts of patriotism and honor without spoon-feeding us with manipulative background music or provocative dialogue." Bollywood Hungama gave the film a rating of 3.5 out of 5, saying that, "Raazi is an interesting thriller brilliantly narrated by Meghna Gulzar that makes for mature viewing. It is a film that celebrates nationalism that is devoid of the colors of religion." Suhani Singh from India Today gave the film 2.5 out of 5 stars stating "Alia Bhatt steals the show in Meghna Gulzar's spy thriller".

In a negative review, Kennith Rosario of The Hindu commented, "There's a lot going for Raazi yet there's a nagging lack of novelty – whether it is the film's plot, message or Bhatt's ability to cry." Raja Sen of NDTV gave the film a rating of 3 out of 5 saying that, "There is a lot to like in Meghna Gulzar's spy movie, but Alia Bhatt makes it hard to take Raazi seriously." Nandini Ramnath of Scroll.in said that, "Alia Bhatt shines in a muddled and improbable spy thriller."

Box office
Raazi emerged as the tenth highest-grossing Hindi film of 2018. It became the second film driven by a female lead to gross more than  100 crore nett in India, after Tanu Weds Manu Returns. The film grossed more than 158 crore in India, emerging as the highest-grossing film for Alia Bhatt, surpassing Badrinath Ki Dulhania. Raazi has grossed a total of  worldwide.

Accolades

See also

The Ghazi Attack

Notes

References

External links 
 
 
 Raazi at Bollywood Hungama

2018 films
2010s Hindi-language films
Films based on Indian novels
India–Pakistan relations in popular culture
Films scored by Shankar–Ehsaan–Loy
2010s spy thriller films
Indian spy thriller films
Films shot in Mumbai
Films shot in Punjab, India
Films shot in Jammu and Kashmir
Films about the Research and Analysis Wing
Military of Pakistan in films
Films based on thriller novels
Muhammad Iqbal